Argun (also Romanized as Ārgūn; also known as Ārqūn-e ‘Olyā) is a village in Sarajuy-ye Sharqi Rural District, Saraju District, Maragheh County, East Azerbaijan Province, Iran. At the 2006 census, its population was 193, in 27 families.

Name 
According to Vladimir Minorsky, the name of the village is derived from the Mongolian personal name Arghun.

References 

Towns and villages in Maragheh County